Juan Mera González (born 22 November 1993) is a Spanish professional footballer who plays as a midfielder for I-League club RoundGlass Punjab.

Club career

Spain 
Born in Gijón, Asturias, he made his senior debut with Sporting de Gijón B in the 2010–11 season. Juan played his first match on 29 August 2010 against Gimnástica Torrelavega He played for Sporting B, in Segunda División B, till 2015–16 season. He scored 21 goals. In 2016–17, he was promoted to Sporting Gijón.

After that he joined Celta Vigo B, Racing Ferrol, Teruel, and Leioa in Spain till 2018–19 and played in Segunda División B.

India 
On 24 August 2019, Juan pursued a one-year deal and moved to Indian club, East Bengal FC. On 12 September, he played his first match for the club in Calcutta Football League, against Kalighat MS.

He made his professional league debut on 4 December 2019 in I-League, in match against Real Kashmir FC He assisted a goal and was also named Man of the Match.

In 2021, he moved to another I-League side NEROCA and made his debut for the club on 27 December in their 3–2 win against Sreenidi Deccan.

In September 2022, he signed for another I-League club RoundGlass Punjab. The club later clinched its second I-League title in 2022–23 season and gained promotion to 2023–24 Indian Super League.

Career statistics

Club

Honours
RoundGlass Punjab
 I-League: 2022–23

Individual
 I-League best midfielder of the season: 2022–23

References

External links

1993 births
Living people
Footballers from Gijón
Spanish footballers
Association football wingers
Segunda División B players
Sporting de Gijón B players
Celta de Vigo B players
Racing de Ferrol footballers
CD Teruel footballers
SD Leioa players
CD Lealtad players
I-League players
East Bengal Club players
Spanish expatriate footballers
Spanish expatriate sportspeople in India
Expatriate footballers in India
NEROCA FC players
Calcutta Football League players